Grand Trunk Western 5629 was a 4-6-2 K-4a steam locomotive built by American Locomotive Company (ALCO) in 1924, for the Grand Trunk Western Railroad. It was a copy of the USRA Light Pacific locomotives. It became famous after being purchased by Richard Jensen for use in pulling several excursion trains in the Chicago area throughout the 1960s. After Jensen ran into some financial trouble, he stored his locomotive at the Rock Island Railroad's freight yard in Blue Island, Illinois. No. 5629 was subsequently the subject to a legal battle between Jensen and Metra Commuter Rail in the mid-1980s, and it ultimately led to the locomotive's scrapping in July 1987.

History

Revenue service
5629 was built by the American Locomotive Company's (ALCO) Schenectady, New York plant in February 1924, and it was delivered via the New York Central to the Grand Trunk Western Railroad (GTW) that same month. It was the third member of the GTW's K-4a class locomotives, numbered 5627-5631, which were copies of the United States Railroad Administration's (USRA) "Light Pacific" design. They were followed by 3 K-4b's, numbered 5632-5634. The only difference was that they had an all-weather cab, and they were built by the Baldwin Locomotive Works. No. 5629 had a mostly uneventful career with the GTW, pulling commuter trains  throughout the Lower Peninsula of Michigan and Northern Indiana, as well as freight trains in later years, until the GTW completely dieselized their locomotive fleet.

Excursion service
Shortly before it was scheduled to be retired and sold for scrap, No. 5629 became one of a few steam locomotives on the GTW to be used to pull fan trips that were sponsored by the Michigan Railroad Club. The fantrip No. 5629 pulled took place on September 27, 1959 between Detroit and Bay City, Michigan. Around the same time, Richard "Dick" Jensen, a railfan from the Chicago area, was looking for a steam locomotive to purchase with the desire operate his own steam-powered excursion trains, and as a passenger on board the September 27th trip, he thought the No. 5629 locomotive was a perfect candidate for its pulling power and high speed. After saving up money from his job as a bread delivery man for the Catherine-Clark Baking Company, Jensen purchased No. 5629 in March 1960 for its scrap value of $9,540.40. 

The locomotive was subsequently moved on its own wheels to a rented sideline at a Baltimore and Ohio (B&O) yard in Hammond, Indiana to be rebuilt. Jensen, with the help of Illinois Central roundhouse foreman Irv Kaufran, worked up to fifty hours a week on getting the locomotive running again, having to drive a two-hour round trip between his home near Chicago and Hammond. One night, he fell a sleep while repairing No. 5629 from underneath, and he woke up at 3:30 AM before returning to his home to receive three hours of sleep in his bed. In early October 1961, No. 5629 was fired up under private ownership for the first time. 

It made a few test runs around the Hammond area before preparations were made for it to pull its first excursion run; a complete tour of the Baltimore and Ohio Chicago Terminal Railroad (B&OCT) scheduled on October 22, and it was delayed until it took place on November 5. Following the success of the tour, No. 5629 would pull additional excursion trains on the B&OCT trackage for the Railroad Club of Chicago's "Iron Horse Excursions" program. Jensen also acquired multiple spare parts from scrap dealers in order to use them on No. 5629, and some of them cosmetically altered the locomotive's appearance to a more typical USRA locomotive, including two visor marker lights from a Chicago and Illinois Midland locomotive and a visor headlight from Illinois Central 2-8-4 8049. No. 5629 would be stored at the B&O roundhouse in Hammond, while Jensen searched for a more suitable location to store his equipment. In 1964, Jensen became close friends with president of the Chicago and Western Indiana Railroad (C&WI) Robert McMillan, who generously agreed to allow Jensen to store his equipment in a portion of the C&WI's roundhouse on 49th Street in Chicago. The roundhouse was often referred to by railroaders as the 47th Street Roundhouse, and prior to dieselization, it was formerly used to house and service steam locomotives that had arrived at the nearby Dearborn Station. The agreement was finallized on July 16, 1964, and McMillan, being a long-time steam fan, was occasionally allowed to run No. 5629 on break-in runs during the beginning of each excursion over the C&WI trackage. Jensen subsequently founded a group called the Midwest Steam Railfans Association (MSRA), which was dedicated to operate and maintain No. 5629 and other locomotives he owned, as well as locomotives other people owned but he was associated with repairing, like GTW USRA 2-8-2 No. 4070. 

After being moved to the 47th Street Roundhouse, No. 5629 was being repaired and prepped to haul several long-distance excursion trains on mainline trackage owned by the GTW, as well as former Nickel Plate Road (NKP) and Wabash trackage that was recently acquired by the Norfolk and Western Railway (N&W). During this time, it was refitted with a six-axle tender formerly paired with Soo Line 4-8-2 No. 4013 in order to increase the locomotive's fuel and water capacity. The locomotive's original four-axle tender was subsequently used for coal storage. The first of the scheduled long-distance trips took place in May 1966, when No. 5629 travelled to Indianapolis, and to celebrate the Sesquicentennial of the state of Indiana, the locomotive pulled a series of excursion trains between Indianapolis and Noblesville. During one of the excursions, No. 5629's water injector suffered a malfunction, and the N&W ordered the crews to drop the locomotive's fire after stopping on the mainline as a safety precaution. While two diesel locomotives pulled the excursion to Noblesville, No. 5629 was towed back to Indianapolis, and Jensen drove back to Chicago to grab some tools and spare parts to repair the locomotive's injector by the following day. 

Once the Sesquicentennial celebrations were over, No. 5629 moved via the N&W to Decatur, Illinois. A tourist railroad operation on the Illinois Central between Decatur and Springfield was proposed, with No. 5629 planned to be loaned as their main motive power. The locomotive spent several weeks in storage in Decatur and in Springfield before the tourist operation was cancelled due to a lack of funds, and No. 5629 was moved back to Chicago. The locomotive spent the rest of the 1966 operating season pulling Railroad Club of Chicago-sponsored excursion trains on the GTW's mainline between Chicago, South Bend, Indiana, and Detroit. During this time, former GTW road foreman Theodore “Bud” Young was tasked to drive No. 5629 during the excursion runs over the GTW mainline. After he became friends with Jensen, Bud Young became No. 5629’s regular engineer for the remainder of its excursion career.
In 1967, No. 5629 returned to the GTW to pull several more trips out of Chicago. It was also tasked to pull the Schlitz Circus World Museum train from Baraboo to Milwaukee, Wisconsin on the Chicago and North Western Railroad's (C&NW) mainline; the usual steam locomotive that pulled the train, Burlington Route 2-8-2 No. 4960, had retired the previous year, and No. 5629 was selected as a replacement. The locomotive returned to Baraboo to pull the train again in 1968, but that year's Circus parade was cancelled, despite the train's arrival in Milwaukee. Around that time, Southern Railway president William Claytor Jr. and Southern steam program head, Bill Purdie, arranged a business meeting with Jensen in Chicago with the hopes of purchasing the No. 5629 locomotive for use to pull excursion trains for the Southern steam program while cosmetically altered as a Southern Railway Ps-4 class. However, Jensen arrived at the meeting several hours late, almost causing Claytor and Purdie to miss their train back home, and he was covered in soot and grease from working on his locomotive. When Claytor and Purdie made a big offer to purchase No. 5629, Jensen declined, believing the locomotive was worth an unreasonably higher amount. 

In February 1969, No. 5629 moved to Detroit for an excursion run, but after the new owners of the C&WI ordered Jensen to vacate his belongings from the 47th Street Roundhouse, No. 5629 was kept in Detroit for temporary storage. Jensen soon had the locomotive relocated to be stored in Penn Central’s yard outside of Chicago’s Union Station. He then planned to use the locomotive to pull an excursion train on April 25, 1971 over the Penn Central mainline between Chicago and Logansport, but it was cancelled due to insurance issues with the Rock Island Railroad over arranging passenger cars to be used for the trip. Ticket buyers wanted refunds, but Jensen never gave most of the buyers their money back. Because Jensen had paid for some passenger cars to be moved to Chicago which never came, as well as having gone through a legal battle with the C&WI over losing most of his equipment to an illegal sale, he was left with a heavy financial deficit. Around the same time, other steam excursion trips hauled by other locomotives, including Reading 4-8-4 No. 2102 and Canadian National 4-8-4 No. 6218, were also taking place in the Chicago area and Northern Indiana, and Jensen began to struggle to keep up with the competition. Some railroads in the Northern Midwest also received new management that wasn’t interested in allowing private steam operations to take place on their trackage. These factors led to Jensen losing interest in hosting steam excursion trips altogether.

Final years 
In 1977, Jensen broke his back from slipping and falling while helping a friend move a refrigerator to a third-floor apartment, landing him in the hospital for several weeks. This crippled the rest of Jensen's finances, and he could no longer afford to pay rent to store his equipment. Falling behind on rent to store No. 5629 in the Chicago Union Station yard, Jensen subsequently approached several railroads in the Chicago area for permission to store his locomotive on their property, but all of them denied his requests. At one point, Jensen drove to the offices of the Chicago South Shore and South Bend Railroad, and after demanding they store No. 5629, he was almost escorted from the premises. As a last resort, Jensen reached an agreement with the Rock Island Railroad (which was also running into serious financial trouble) to store the locomotive in their deteriorating roundhouse in Blue Island, Illinois. However, Jensen never paid the Rock Island to store his locomotive, and he later ended up owing thousands of dollars in rent. In 1979, the Blue Island roundhouse was scheduled to be demolished, and No. 5629 was moved towards the middle of the Rock Island’s Burr Oak freight yard.After the Rock Island ceased operations in March 1980, Metra, Chicago's commuter railroad, acquired the Burr Oak yard, and they began planning to construct a new shop complex in the yard. Although Metra was allowed to use the yard, they weren’t allowed to move No. 5629, because it was owned by Jensen. After redevelopment plans were finalized, the commuter operator ordered Jensen to move No. 5629 150 yards to the nearby Iowa Interstate Railroad, but they initially informed him they wouldn't provide him any assistance in getting the locomotive there. When Jensen inspected and prepared the locomotive to be moved, he discovered that his locomotive was vandalized during its time stored in the Burr Oak yard; it was stripped of some of its critical moving parts, including the bearings of the wheels, and it was landlocked with bits of trackage in front of it removed. It led to Jensen thinking that if he hadn’t done anything to move No. 5629, and if it were scrapped, he could file a lawsuit against Metra and win over a million dollars; enough money to solve his financial problems. Consequently, instead of exploring ways to move his locomotive to another location, Jensen removed additional critical components from No. 5629, and he sold all of them to local railfans.  

Metra became annoyed by Jensen leaving No. 5629 where it was, and they negotiated with him while sending him bills for the locomotive's storage, but he never paid them back, and he was unwilling to work with the railroad or repair the locomotive. By the end of 1986, Metra have had enough and went to court, and the ruling ordered that if Jensen didn’t remove the locomotive from Metra’s property, it would be destroyed. Several groups subsequently made attempts to move No. 5629 without Jensen's approval, but to no avail; the Illinois Railway Museum offered to purchase No. 5629 for its scrap value of $15,000 from Jensen, but it was declined, as was a subsequent offer from the Mid-Continent Railway Museum. Metra also requested to court that they assume ownership of the locomotive and donate it to a museum that would be able to move it, but court said they couldn’t legally claim ownership of Jensen’s property. By June 1987, Metra, fearing the locomotive would become a safety hazard after being stripped of critical parts, banned Jensen from entering the Burr Oak yard. On July 1, 1987, a relieved Metra, albeit sad to see No. 5629 go, received a court order to scrap the locomotive on sight, but for reasons unknown, Jensen appealed the order. Court declined Jensen’s appeal nine days later, and Metra contracted the Erman-Howell division of the Luria Brothers Scrap Company to dispose of No. 5629 right where it stood. Scrapping began on July 14, it was completed on July 17, and No. 5629’s remains were trucked away by July 20. So many people showed up to witness the scrapping that Metra police began kicking people out of Burr Oak yard. 

Following the scrapping, Jensen filed a lawsuit against Metra and requested compensation money as planned, but court did not rule in his favor. Metra subsequently discovered that much of the vandalism done to the locomotive prior to the legal battle had been done by Metra employees, several of which were laid off after a thorough investigation took place in 1988 and 1989. Jensen passed away from failing health on March 16, 1991 at the age of 59. As of 2022, the history of No. 5629 is remembered as a tragedy of North American railroad preservation, but the locomotive's class is currently well represented by GTW No. 5632, a K-4b class 4-6-2, which is on static display in Durand, Michigan, and GTW No. 5030, a J-3b class 4-6-2, which is on static display in Jackson, Michigan while waiting to be moved to the Colebrookdale Railroad in Pennsylvania for restoration.

See also
Atlantic Coast Line 1504, another USRA Light Pacific
Chicago, Burlington and Quincy 5632, another locomotive that was owned by Richard Jensen
Grand Trunk Western 6039
Grand Trunk Western 6323
Grand Trunk Western 6325
Nickel Plate Road 587
Soo Line 2719

References

Bibliography

External links

4-6-2 locomotives
ALCO locomotives
Individual locomotives of the United States
Standard gauge locomotives of the United States
Steam locomotives of the United States
USRA locomotives
5629
Scrapped locomotives